Cluster & Eno is a collaborative album by German electronic music group Cluster and English ambient musician Brian Eno. The style of this album is a collection of gentle melodies: a mixture of Eno's ambient sensibilities and Cluster's avant-garde style.

In June 1977, the duo of Hans-Joachim Roedelius and Dieter Moebius joined with Brian Eno for recording sessions at Conny Plank's studio. The first release from those sessions on Sky Records was Cluster & Eno. Guest musicians on the album included Can bassist Holger Czukay and Asmus Tietchens on synthesizer. The association with Eno, already well known for involvement with pop acts like Roxy Music, brought Cluster a much wider audience than previous albums and international attention.

Sky Records issued the album on CD in 1989, shuffling the running order. The American Gyroscope label reissued Cluster & Eno on CD in 1996. The album was also reissued in the United States by the San Francisco-based Water label in 2005.

Reception

Bryan Reesman, in his editorial review for Amazon, writes, in part:

Track listing
All songs composed by Brian Eno, Dieter Moebius and Hans-Joachim Roedelius.
"Ho Renomo" – 5:07
"Schöne Hände" – 3:03
"Steinsame" – 4:06
"Wehrmut" – 5:01
"Mit Simaen" – 1:30
"Selange" – 3:30
"Die Bunge" – 3:45
"One" – 6:06
"Für Luise" – 3:20

Some editions have the track names "Wehrmut" and "Für Luise" swapped.

Personnel
Hans-Joachim Roedelius
Dieter Moebius
Brian Eno

Additional musicians
Holger Czukay – bass on "Ho Renomo"
Okko Bekker – guitar on "One"
Asmus Tietchens – synthesizer on "One"

Technical personnel
Conny Plank – engineer
J. Krämer – assistant engineer
Cluster – cover

References

Works cited

External links
 

Brian Eno albums
Cluster (band) albums
1977 albums
Albums produced by Conny Plank
Collaborative albums